Roldana petasitis, the velvet groundsel, is a species of the genus Roldana and family Asteraceae that used to be classified in the genus Senecio.

Distribution
Native
Neotropic
Mexico Southwest: Colima, Guerrero, Jalisco, Michoacán, Nayarit, Oaxaca
Mesoamerica: El Salvador, Guatemala, Honduras, Nicaragua

References

External links

Senecioneae
Flora of Central America
Flora of Colima
Flora of Guerrero
Flora of Jalisco
Flora of Michoacán
Flora of Nayarit
Flora of Oaxaca
Flora of El Salvador
Flora of Guatemala
Flora of Honduras
Flora of Nicaragua